Turnov is a town in Semily District in the Liberec Region of the Czech Republic. It has about 14,000 inhabitants. It is a traditional centre for gemstone polishing, glass craftsmanship and arts. The town centre is well preserved and is protected by law as an urban monument zone.

Turnov lies near the Bohemian Paradise Protected Landscape Area which makes it a place for tourists and summer residents. The town is also an important traffic crossroads of three railways and the Prague–Liberec highway. Turnov has a large museum, three galleries, six churches, and a synagogue. The small old town of Middle Ages urbanism is surrounded by modern garden neighbourhoods and large parks representing an organic connection between urban areas and nature.

Administrative parts
Villages and town parts of Bukovina, Daliměřice, Dolánky u Turnova, Hrubý Rohozec, Kadeřavec, Kobylka, Loužek, Malý Rohozec, Mašov, Mokřiny, Pelešany, and Vazovec are administrative parts of Turnov.

Geography
The Jizera River flows through the town. It lies in the Jičín Uplands. Turnov lies at the edge of the Bohemian Paradise Protected Landscape Area.

History
Turnov was founded as a Bohemian town around 1250 by Jaroslav and Havel of Markvartice on a spur of rock overlooking the Jizera River. A Dominican cloister was founded by Saint Zdislava, wife of Sir Havel. During the Middle Ages, Turnov came into the possession of the Wartenberg and Smiřický noble houses. The medieval town was frequently vulnerable to fires – it was burnt by Lusatian crusaders in 1468 and during the Thirty Years' War by Swedes in 1643, as well as a conflagration in 1707.

Turnov has long been known for its expertise with gemstones. It attracted many medieval craftsmen and artisans who produced jewelry out the local Bohemian garnet. The first European technical school for the processing of gemstones, metals, and jewelry, nowadays the Applied Arts Secondary School, was founded in Turnov in 1884 and still exists as one of the best schools of this type in the world.

Jewish community
The Turnov Jewish community was first documented in 1527. After it ceased to exist at the turn of the 16th and 17th centuries, new Jewish settlers were invited to the town by Albrecht von Wallenstein in 1623. The Jewish ghetto was established in 1647. Most of the Jewish population were killed during the Holocaust and only 19 of them returned to Turnov after World War II. The Jewish community officially ceased to exist in 1961.

Demographics

Sights

The Renaissance town hall in Turnov dates from 1562, while its three historical churches date from throughout the 14th–19th centuries. In a suburb lies the Hrubý Rohozec Castle, built in 1250 and later reconstructed into a château; today it is admissible to the public. The municipality itself is now the owner of the Valdštejn Castle, the cradle of the famous Wallenstein family, which is also open for tourists.

The former synagogue in Turnov dates from 1779. Between the 1950s and 2003, the building was used as a warehouse. In 2003, the building was bought by the Town of Turnov and it was restored to become a concert place and a memorial. The Jewish cemetery was founded in the 17th century. The oldest preserved tombstone dates from 1649.

Museum of the Bohemian Paradise in Turnov has a significant collection of gemstones and jewelry, as well as exhibits on geology, archaeology, and folklore. It was founded in 1886.

Notable people
Josef Pekař (1870–1937), historian
Jan Košek (1884–1927), footballer
Jan Patočka (1907–1977), philosopher
Alexandr Kliment (1929–2017), novelist
Jan Farský (born 1979), politician
Roman Koudelka (born 1989), ski jumper
Adam Helcelet (born 1991), decathlete

Twin towns – sister cities

Turnov is twinned with:
 Alvesta, Sweden
 Idar-Oberstein, Germany
 Jawor, Poland
 Keszthely, Hungary
 Murska Sobota, Slovenia
 Niesky, Germany

References

External links

Official tourist information portal
Museum of the Bohemian Paradise
The Bohemian Paradise

Cities and towns in the Czech Republic
Populated places in Semily District
Populated places established in the 13th century